The Canadian Society of Clinical Chemists  (CSCC) is a non-profit national scientific and professional society that represents clinical chemists (also known as clinical biochemists) across Canada. Its purpose is to advance the practice of clinical chemistry in Canada through the promotion of excellence in education, research and practice, by means of activities at the international, national, provincial and local levels.  In Canada, clinical chemists are members of the medical laboratory management team that consists of pathologists, laboratory managers and senior technologists. They are primarily responsible for setting the standards of performance for the clinical biochemistry laboratory. They use skills developed through post doctoral training programs to ensure that laboratory services meet the needs of the patients while being delivered efficiently. They monitor the quality of the testing services and act as technical experts to evaluate and select methods and instrumentation. They apply clinical and technical knowledge to assist physicians with the selection and interpretation of tests and to support the research and teaching activities of the laboratory.

History
The founding meeting for the CSCC was held in Montreal, Quebec on Oct 17th 1956. Since that time the membership has grown to several hundred clinical chemists and highlights of the society's accomplishments during its first 50 years were documented by Dr. Arlene Crowe (past president) in Clinical Biochemistry.  

In 1986 the Canadian Academy of Clinical Biochemistry was established as the academic body of the CSCC to oversee training, certification, accreditation, and professional development of clinical chemists in Canada. A syllabus for post doctoral training in clinical biochemistry was developed and is maintained by the CACB as a guide to program directors and trainees.

Activities
The CSCC holds an Annual Scientific Congress and Annual General Meeting. The 61st annual CSCC conference was held in San Diego, CA, USA July 31-August 4, 2017 as a joint meeting with the AACC.
Publications include the scientific journal Clinical Biochemistry,
a member newsletter CSCC News, and position papers on current issues such as cardiac troponin testing.
 The organization's members meet with governments, both medical and allied health organizations.
Special interest groups have been developed to advance knowledge and produce solutions in: Clinical Toxicology, Point-Of-Care Testing, Pediatric and Perinatal Biochemistry, Monoclonal Gammopathy, Autoverification of test results and the Canadian Laboratory Initiative on Paediatric Reference Intervals - CALIPER.

The CSCC is a full member of the International Federation of Clinical Chemistry and Laboratory Medicine (IFCC), which is associated with the International Union of Pure and Applied Chemistry (IUPAC).

References

External links 
 Canadian Society of Clinical Chemists 
 Canadian Academy of Clinical Biochemistry
 Canadian Laboratory Initiative on Paediatric Reference Intervals (CALIPER)
 The International Federation of Clinical Chemistry and Laboratory Medicine

1956 establishments in Ontario
Chemistry societies
Medical and health organizations based in Ontario
Organizations based in Kingston, Ontario